Phi Sigma Iota is an honor society whose members are elected from among outstanding advanced (juniors and seniors) and graduate students of foreign languages and literatures including Classics, comparative literature, philology, bilingual education, and applied linguistics. The primary objectives of this honorary are the recognition of remarkable ability and attainments in languages and literatures, and the promotion of a sentiment of amity between cultures with differing languages.

Mission statement

The mission of the Society is: the recognition of outstanding accomplishment in the study or teaching of a foreign language; an appreciation for diverse points of view, derived from the knowledge and use of a foreign language; the encouragement of a lifelong commitment to the study and promotion of foreign languages and cultures, and; the pursuit of research in foreign languages and cultures.

Eligibility, requirements, and membership

Phi Sigma Iota honors undergraduate students who have chosen to pursue a curriculum with emphasis in foreign languages (a major or a minor), who have at least a B (3.0 GPA) average in their college course of study as well as in all courses in foreign languages, who rank in the top 35% of their class, and who have completed at least one course in a foreign language at the third-year level or beyond.

As a rule, undergraduates are not elected to PSI prior to junior standing; however, sophomores of exceptional abilities who meet all stated minimal requirements, having completed at least 45 semester hours may be elected to membership. Graduate students studying one or more languages may also be elected to membership after 12 semester hours of graduate residence, provided that they shall have attained a minimum grade point average of 3.5 in graduate studies.

Professional Members.  Alumni of collegiate chapters shall be professional members. Others meeting the following criteria may be elected to professional membership: have made a distinctive contribution to the profession and (a) earned one or more degrees in foreign language and ranked within the top 35% of the class as undergraduates or 3.5 as graduate students and not been previously initiated into the Society, (b) earned one or more degrees qualifying them to work in the field and rank in the top 35% as undergraduates or 3.5 as graduate students, or (c) faculty of the university, after one academic year of teaching in that institution and having shown remarkable ability in their field as well as demonstrating support of the ideals of the Society .

Honorary members shall be persons outside the field, excluding those who are employed in the field, who have made distinctive scholarly and research contributions to the study, use, or promotion of foreign languages and the ideals of the Society..

Membership in the Society is open to qualified candidates including persons with disability, without regard to age, color, gender, national origin, race, religion, and/or sexual orientation.

Phi Sigma Iota pledge

"We believe that a discerning and sympathetic understanding of the peoples of the world is essential to the welfare of humanity; that peace among nations and international amity are dependent upon an altruistic willingness to appreciate the character, the ideals, and the culture and civilization of other countries; that the study of foreign languages is one of the best means of contributing to such global understanding; that a broad study of international cultures is also essential to an adequate comprehension of all races and peoples; that it is our duty as world citizens to learn all that we can about the peoples of the world and to strive to judge their achievements objectively, fairly, and tolerantly; that it is our obligation to disseminate our knowledge and informed judgment as widely as possible in order to further international understanding; that it is incumbent upon us to attempt to inspire in others an interest in the language, literature, and other cultural manifestations of all races and peoples; and finally, we believe that we ourselves should continue the study of language, literature and culture in order to extend the horizons of our own understanding."

History

Phi Sigma Iota was founded in 1922 at Allegheny College by Dr. Henry W. Church, members of his department of languages, and advanced students who were meeting to discuss linguistic and literary matters.   became a national society when its Beta chapter was established at The Pennsylvania State University in April 1925.  Less than a year later, a Gamma chapter at the College of Wooster followed them.  With these three chapters as the nucleus of the national organization, the first convention was held in May 1926, at Allegheny College.  Since that time expansion has been steady.

In November 1935, Phi Sigma Iota was merged with Alpha Zeta Pi, a similar society west of the Mississippi.  The merger took place at a National Convention held at Bloomington, Illinois.  Dr. Etienne Renaud and his associates in the Department of Languages had organized Alpha Zeta Pi in October 1917 at the University of Denver.

In 1949, Phi Sigma Iota was granted membership into the U. S. Association of College Honor Societies (ACHS), the first language society to receive that honor.

In 1978, under the Presidency of Dr. Santiago Vilas, the Society expanded into the National Foreign Language Honor Society Phi Sigma Iota to honor outstanding achievements in any foreign language including Classics, Philology, Applied Linguistics, Comparative Literature, and Bilingual Education.

In 1982, the Society became the International Foreign Language Honor Society by installing its first Chapter in a foreign country (Universidad Regiomontana, Monterrey, Mexico).

Every year Phi Sigma Iota awards several scholastic grants to its members.  The first scholarship was established in 1939 in memory of the founder and first National President, Dr. Church.  In 1970, another scholarship was established in memory of Dr. Anthony S. Corbiere, who for nearly thirty years was National Historian, Editor of the Newsletter, and Executive Secretary of Phi Sigma Iota.  In 2000, two additional named scholarships were inaugurated.  One to honor Dr. Cleon Capsus, professor of Spanish and Portuguese at the University of South Florida and one to honor the years of devoted work on behalf of PSI by Dr. Santiago Vilas.  The Dr. Marie-France Hilgar Scholarship was established to honor former President Dr. Hilgar.

Insignia and etymology

The insignia of the society, adopted in 1935, was designed by Robert E. Dengler, 1893–1973, Professor of Classics at the Pennsylvania State University. The words PHI, SIGMA, and IOTA may be understood, respectively, as Φιλοτης (or Philotès, meaning Friendship), Σπουδη (or Spoudé, meaning Research and also Individuality), and Ιδιωμα (or Idioma, meaning Zeal).

The key of the society is dominated by a five-pointed star. The center of this star represents the literary languages of classical antiquity: Greek, Latin, Sanskrit and Hebrew. These tongues live on today in spirit, furnishing the foundation for many modern languages and transmitting to the western world the basis of much of its culture. Originally a Romance language society, Latin, the foundation of our modern Romance languages, formed the foundation of the insignia and was symbolized by the ivy wreath which surrounds the star on the Phi Sigma Iota key. The key was designed in 1935 by Robert E. Dengler, Professor of Classics at the Pennsylvania State University, and since 1935 was the bimillenniaum of Horace's birth, Dr. Dengler put an ivy wreath in the design to recall the words of Horace, the Roman poet of the height of Augustian literature who wrote: "As for me, I want the ivy, the crown of learned brows, that unites me with the gods above..." The five-point star originally stood for the Romance languages but now are symbolic of the many rays of learning which emanate from all linguistic and literary traditions. The shield of Phi Sigma Iota comprises designs meant to recall various language and literary traditions represented by the Society. Today the Society represents not only the Romance languages, but all languages.

The colors of the Society are purple and white.

The Forum

The Forum of Phi Sigma Iota is published annually and includes articles (both scholarly and anecdotal), poetry, art, and humor written by and for Society members.

External links
Homepage of Phi Sigma Iota
  ACHS Psi Sigma Iota entry
  Psi Sigma Iota chapter list at ACHS

Association of College Honor Societies
Honor societies
College of Wooster
Student organizations established in 1922
1922 establishments in Pennsylvania